Man About Town is the fourth studio album by American singer Mayer Hawthorne. It was released on April 8, 2016, by BMG Rights Management and Vagrant Records.

Singles
The album's lead single, "Cosmic Love", was released on January 14, 2016, its music video was released on February 11, 2016.

Critical reception

Man About Town was met with generally positive reviews. At Metacritic, which assigns a normalized rating out of 100 to reviews from mainstream publications, the album received an average score of 74, based on eight reviews. Aggregator AnyDecentMusic? gave it 6.4 out of 10, based on their assessment of the critical consensus.

Mark Deming of AllMusic said, "Man About Town doesn't boast much in the way of radical steps forward. But it confirms the man is still very good at what he does". Ken Capobianco of The Boston Globe said, "Highlights album come when the songs stretch beyond Hawthorne's solo comfort zone". Mackenzie Herd of Exclaim! said, "There is an invigorating energy that shines through the lyrics and tempo of this album, so although lyrics about the finer things of California living aren't necessarily profound or entirely relatable, on Man About Town, Hawthorne's buoyant optimism for beginning anew in 2016 is utterly contagious".

Colin McGuire of PopMatters said, "Like it or not, there aren't many people who can pull off what Mayer Hawthorne does best these days as well as Mayer Hawthorne does it. It fills a very real void in an increasingly crowded and grossly jaded pop music world. It is, in essence, important work". Charles Waring of Record Collector said, "Containing 10 songs and with a running time of 30 minutes, it's tantalisingly brief but never short of quality". Rachel Aroesti of The Guardian said, "For the most part, he remains in relatively banal lyrical territory on this fourth album, but what he's able to do with some aplomb is capture the majestic effortlessness of the Motown sound".

Track listing

Personnel
Credits for Man About Town adapted from AllMusic.

 Joe Abramson – bass guitar
 Hubert Alexander – fender rhodes, keyboards
 Ambroise Aubrun – violin
 Sam Beaubien – trumpet
 Benny Sings – organ, pianette
 Ben Bortelt – viola
 Lola Delon – background vocals
 Rhea Fowler – violin
 Gerald Glecer – electric guitar
 Mayer Hawthorne – bass guitar, cabasa, drum programming, drums, fender rhodes, glockenspiel, acoustic guitar, electric guitar, handclapping, marimba, soloist, string arrangements, synthesizer, tambourine, vibraphone, lead vocals, background vocals, wurlitzer, keyboards
 Jim Hocker – trumpet
 Brian Inscore – bass guitar, crumar orchestrator, drums, acoustic guitar, electric guitar, wurlitzer
 Jimi James – saxophone, background vocals
 Quentin Joseph – drums
 Justin Jozwick – saxophone
 Matt Martinez – trombone
 Jimetta Rose – background vocals
 Harlan Silverman – cello
 Joe Splash – bass guitar, drums, string arrangements
 Juan Turros – saxophone
 Sam Wishkowski – string arrangements
 Christian Wunderlich – electric guitar, soloist

Charts

References

2016 albums
Albums produced by Dave Tozer
Albums produced by Jack Splash
Mayer Hawthorne albums
Vagrant Records albums